Wilfredo Camacho (born 21 June 1935) is a Bolivian former footballer. He played in nine matches for the Bolivia national football team from 1963 to 1967. He was also part of Bolivia's squad that won the 1963 South American Championship.

References

External links
 

1935 births
Living people
Bolivian footballers
Bolivia international footballers
Place of birth missing (living people)
Association football midfielders
Once Caldas footballers
Ferro Carril Oeste footballers
C.D. Jorge Wilstermann players
Bolivian expatriate footballers
Expatriate footballers in Colombia
Expatriate footballers in Argentina
Bolivian football managers
Once Caldas managers
The Strongest managers
Bolivia national football team managers
Club Always Ready managers
Club Bolívar managers
Universitario de Sucre managers